Herwig Franz Schopper (born 28 February 1924) is a Czech-born experimental physicist and was the director general of CERN from 1981 to 1988.

Biography
Schopper was born in Lanškroun, Bohemia, to a family of Austrian descent. He obtained his diploma and doctorate from the University of Hamburg studying under Wilhelm Lenz and Rudolf Fleischmann. In 1950–51 he was a research assistant with Lise Meitner at Stockholm and in 1956–57 at the Cavendish Laboratory under Otto Robert Frisch.

During these fellowships, Schopper worked on nuclear physics and contributed substantially to the evidence of parity violation in weak interactions. He measured the circular polarization of gamma rays following a beta decay, thought unfeasible by Lee and Yang, and showed in the same experiment that the helicities of neutrino and antineutrino are opposite. Later, he was involved in an experiment to test time reversal symmetry. In 1956, he followed Fleischmann to the University of Erlangen where he continued to do research in optics and solid-state physics, with emphasis on thin metal layers, which he had started at Hamburg. Also he developed, along with Clausnitzer, the first source of polarised protons. In 1957 he became Privatdozent at the University of Erlangen.

From 1958 to 1961, Schopper was an associate professor at the University of Mainz where he established the Institute for Experimental Nuclear Physics. In 1960–61 he worked under Robert R. Wilson at Cornell University to be introduced to elementary particle physics, namely the use of electron scattering to study the structure of the proton and neutron.

Schopper was appointed professor at the University of Karlsruhe in 1961 and director of the newly established Institutes for Experimental Nuclear Physics of TH Karlsruhe and the Karlsruhe Nuclear Research Centre. In order to continue his research on electron scattering he set up a group to carry out one of the first experiments at DESY. He also created a group at CERN to investigate neutron scattering at high energies at the Proton Synchrotron (PS) and Intersecting Storage Rings (ISR). These experiments where then continued at the Institute for High Energy Physics (IHEP) in Serpukhov, Russia. The group made important contributions to the study of neutron-proton and neutron-nuclei scattering cross sections. For this purpose, the first hadron calorimeter was developed and optimised by Monte Carlo simulations. Another group at Karlsruhe developed the first superconducting high frequency cavities in Europe, a technology which was transferred to CERN for particle separators and later for particle acceleration at LEP.

At CERN, he was a research associate in 1966–67, became division leader of the Nuclear Physics Division in 1970, member of the directorate responsible for the co-ordination of the experimental programme until 1973 and chairman of the ISR Committee from 1973 to 1976.

In 1973 Schopper became professor at the University of Hamburg and the chairman of the directorate of DESY, serving until end of 1980. He was responsible for the installation of the ARGUS detector at DORIS which later resulted in the first evidence of B – B bar mixing. Also, by establishing HASYLAB at DORIS synchrotron light science became an important branch of research at DESY. 
He proposed and completed the construction of the electron-positron collider PETRA which led to the discovery and study of the gluon. During his mandate, DESY, a national laboratory became as far as science was concerned an international particle physics laboratory.  This included the start of the first collaboration with China.

From 1977 to 1979, Schopper was chairman of the Association of the German Large Research Centres (now Helmholtz Association) and member of various advisory bodies of the Federal Ministry of Research, the Deutsche Forschungs Gemeinschaft and the Max Planck Society.

After being member of the Scientific Policy Committee at CERN, Schopper was elected director general and served from 1981 to 1988. His first task was to unite the two CERN laboratories existing at that time under two Directors General. The Large Electron–Positron Collider (LEP) was also proposed and constructed under his leadership. This facility allowed the verification of the standard model of particle physics, namely that it is a renormalizable field theory, leading to the award of the Nobel Prize to the theoreticians Veltman and t’Hooft. Furthermore, it enabled the precise determination of fundamental parameters of the electroweak force, such as the
W± and Z masses, and proved the existence of three neutrino families. Thus, this particle accelerator transformed high energy physics into a field of precision measurements and provided estimates to the mass of the top quark, Higgs boson and other supersymmetric and hypothetical particles. 
LEP was approved under the condition of a reduced and constant budget with the consequence that some unique activities at CERN (e.g. ISR) had to be abandoned. Schopper was obliged to introduce a new way of international collaboration for the four LEP experiments since CERN could not provide funds for them. The experiments became rather independent activities organised in a rather democratic way bringing together hundreds of scientists from many universities and national organisations. The LEP experiments became a model for the later LHC experiments, shaping the way this organization works today.
He contributed to the globalisation of research at CERN and was also responsible for the return of Spain and Portugal in the CERN's member states.

Schopper is professor emeritus at the University of Hamburg since 1989. From 1992 to 1994 he was president of the German Physical Society and president of the European Physical Society in 1995–97. For many years he was member of the scientific council of the Joint Institute for Nuclear Research in Dubna and of the board of trustees of the Max Planck Institute for Plasma Physics in Garching.

At UNESCO, he served as member of the Physics Action Council and chairman of the Working Group on Large Facilities, president of the scientific council of the Regional Office for Science and Technology ROSTE of UNESCO in Venice (2001–2002) and in 2003–2009 he was the chairman of the international advisory committee for the International Basic Science Programs.

Schopper's vision of science without borders resulted in him becoming a founding father of SESAME, the laboratory for Synchrotron-Light for Experimental Science and Applications in the Middle East, which provides an extremely bright light source to investigate a broad range of domains from condensed matter to biology and archeology. In 1999–2008 he became president of the Preliminary International Council and later, after the formal foundation of SESAME, of the International Council. Without his dedication this international research facility would probably not have been built. SESAME was founded analogous to CERN, under the umbrella of UNESCO, with presently nine member states: Bahrain, Cyprus, Egypt, Iran, Israel, Jordan, Pakistan, the Palestinian Authority and Turkey. It provides an environment where countries with different political systems, traditions, religions and mentalities are able to work together peacefully.

Schopper is a founding member of The Cyprus Institute at Nicosia, Cyprus, and since 2000 Member of the board of trustees and was chairman of the Scientific Council and member of the executive committee of the board of trustees of the Cyprus Institute.

Currently, he works as an advisor and goodwill ambassador on science for peace. He writes articles about research policy, science and religion and also science and society.

Honours and awards

Honorary academic degrees
Schopper received honorary doctoral degrees from: University of Erlangen, Moscow State University, University of Geneva, University of London, Joint Institute for Nuclear Research (Dubna),  Institute for High Energy Physics (Protvino) and The Cyprus Institute (Nicosia).

Awards
 Physics Prize of Göttingen Academy of Sciences and Humanities (1957)
 Carus Medal of the Academy of Sciences Leopoldina in Halle (1957)
 Ritter-von-Gerstner-Medal (1978)
 GroßerSudetendeutscherKulturpreis (1984)
 Golden Plate Award of the American Academy of Achievement (USA) (1985)
 Gold Medal of the Weizmann Institute (Israel) with CERN (1985)
 Grosses Bundesverdienstkreuz of the Federal Republik Germany (1989)
 Wilhelm Exner Medal (Österreich) (1991)
 J.E.Purkyne Memorial Medal of the Czech Academy of Sciences (1994)
 Order of Friendship of the Russian Federation awarded by President Yeltsin (1996)
 Grand Cordon of the Order of Independence awarded by King Abdullah II of Jordan (2003) 
 Tate Medal of the American Institute of Physics (2003)
 UNESCO Albert Einstein Gold Medal, Danmark (2004)
 Silver Medal of SESAME International Council (2004)
 UNESCO Niels Bohr Gold Medal (2005)
 Honorary Medal of the Portuguese Minister for higher education and research (2009)
 Physics Medal of first grade of the Czech Physical Society and Union of Czech Mathematicians and Physicists (2010)
 Grand Cross of the Order of Merit of the Republic of Cyprus (2012)
 Golden Honorary Needle of DESY (Hamburg) (2013)
 AAAS Award for Science Diplomacy (2019)

Memberships
 Academy of Sciences Leopoldina in Halle
 Academia Europaea in London
 Academia Scientiarium et Artium Europea in Salzburg 
 Corresponding member of the Bavarian Academy of Sciences in Munich
 Honorary member of the Hungarian Academy of Sciences
 Fellow of the Institute of Physics in London
 Fellow of the American Physical Society
 Academy of Sciences in Lisbon
 Member and trustee of the World Academy of Art and Science in San Francisco 
 Honorary Member of the Swiss Physical Society 
 Honorary Member of European Physical Society 
 Honorary Member of the German Physical Society
 Honorary Member of the Polish Academy of Sciences

Publications and books

Scientific publications
Schopper wrote more than 200 original publications in optics, nuclear physics, elementary particle physics and accelerator technology. Some of the most important works are:
 Fleischmann R. and H. Schopper, The determination of the optical constants and thickness of the layer of absorbent layers by means of the measurement of the absolute phase change Z.Physik 129.285 (1951) (first method for the measurement of the absolute phase upon reflection of light on the thin metal layers)
 H. Schopper, The interpretation of the optical constants of alkali metals, Z.Physik 135, 163 (1953) (the abnormal optical behaviour of thin alkali metal layers does not require a special physical state of the metal)
 H. Schopper, Circular polarization of gamma rays: Further proof for parity failure in beta-decay, Phil.Mag.' 2, 710 (1957) (One of the experiments proposed by Lee and Yang, but considered impossible. In this experiment it was shown for the first time that the helicity of the neutrino and antineutrino are opposite.)
 G. Clausnitzer, R. Fleischmann and H. Schopper, Production of a hydrogen atom beam with parallel nuclear spins, Z.Physik 144, 336 (1956)
 H. Schopper and S. Galster, The circular polarization of internal and external bremsstrahlung, Nucl.Phys. 6, 125 (1958) (first measurement of the circular polarization of the internal bremsstrahlung of beta decay)
 J. Halbritter, R. Hietschold, P. Kneisel, and H. Schopper, Coupling losses and the measurement of Q-values of superconducting cavities, KFK-report Karlsruhe 3 / 86-6 (1968) (early publication of the study of superconducting cavities to accelerate particles)
 R. M. Littauer, H. Schopper, R. R. Wilson, Electromagnetic properties of the proton and neutron, Phys. Rev. Lett. 6, 286 (1961), Phys. Rev. Lett. 7, 141 (1961) and 7, 144 (1961) (measurement of nuclear form factors, improvement of the first measurements by R. Hofstadter)
 Behrend et al., Elastic electron-proton scattering at momentum transfers up to 110 fermi-2, Nuov.Cim. 48.140 (1967)
 J. Engler, W. Flauger, AS. Gibbard, F. Mönnig, K. Runge and H. Schopper, A total absorption spectrometer for energy measurements of high-energy particles, Nucl.Instr.Meth. 106, 189 (1973) (first usage and optimization of a 'hadron calorimeter')
 V. Boehmer et al., Neutron-proton elastic scattering from 10 to 70 GeV / c, Nucl.Phys. B91, 266 (1975) and other publications (neutron-proton scattering at high energies, the ISR at CERN and at the Institute for High Energy Physics in Protvino, Russia)
 L3 Collaboration, Upsilon production in Z decays, Phys.Lett. B 413, 167 (1997) and Heavy Quarkonium Production in Z decays,  CERN-PPE/92-99 and Phys.Lett.B (Schopper was principal author of these publications)
 H.Schopper, The light of SESAME: A dream becomes reality, La Rivista del Nuovo Cimento, 40, 199 (2017)

Books
 H. Schopper, Weak Interactions and Nuclear Beta Decay, North-Holland Publishing (1966)
 H. Schopper, Matter and Antimatter'', Pieper Verlag (1989)
 H. Schopper, LEP — The Lord of the Rings Collider at CERN 1980–2000, Springer Verlag (2009); with a foreword by Rolf-Dieter Heuer; ; e-book 
 Editor of Springer Materials, Landolt-Bornstein, Nuclear and Particle Physics
 H. Schopper and L. Di Lella, editors, 60 years of CERN Experiments and Discoveries, World Scientific (2015); pbk 
 Co-editor of several other books

See also
List of Directors General of CERN
Scientific publications of Herwig Schopper on INSPIRE-HEP

References

1924 births
Living people
People from Lanškroun
20th-century German physicists
People associated with CERN
Commanders Crosses of the Order of Merit of the Federal Republic of Germany
Experimental particle physics
German nuclear physicists
International Centre for Synchrotron-Light for Experimental Science Applications in the Middle East people
Members of the European Academy of Sciences and Arts
Members of the Hungarian Academy of Sciences
UNESCO Niels Bohr Medal recipients
Academic staff of the University of Hamburg
German expatriates in Sweden
German expatriates in the United Kingdom
Presidents of the European Physical Society
Presidents of the German Physical Society
Fellows of the American Physical Society